John Paul College may refer to:

 John Paul College (Brisbane), Queensland, Australia
 John Paul College (New South Wales), New South Wales, Australia
 John Paul College (Kalgoorlie), Western Australia
 John Paul College (Melbourne), Victoria, Australia
 John Paul College (Rotorua), Bay of Plenty, New Zealand

See also 
 JPC (disambiguation)